Canossa College is a Catholic, all-girls' school, founded in 1959. Canossa College is funded by the Government as a subsidised school.

History
 1890. Canossian Sisters in Italy came to Hong Kong in 1860 and to set up the new Canossian Convent Secondary School in 1890.
 1891. Mr. David Sasson, a benefactor, generously donated 3000 sq. ft. of land in Shaukeiwan to establish the House of Shaukeiwan and a primary school for Chinese children
 1932. The primitive House was replaced by a solid three-storey building : the government subsidized Primary School and the Convent, serving pupils of normal sight since 1938.
 1941–45. World War II put the Convent in danger. Luckily, Sisters and inmates were protected by British soldiers.	 
 1950. Occupied by the Japanese Military government during World War II, the school and the convent were returned to the Institute in 1950 and the Chinese Primary School was restored in 1951.
 1959. Canossian Convent Secondary School was officiated with an enrolment of 92 students
 1984. To cope with the rapid development in the Eastern District of Hong Kong, the school was transferred to the present site. The secondary section of the School was renamed Canossa College and the primary section Canossa School (H.K.).
 2004. A four-storey new wing was erected from the parking area.

School facilities
There are 25 classrooms and 18 special rooms (two art rooms, two computer rooms, a language room, four laboratories, four multi-purpose rooms, a needlework room, two cookery rooms, a geography room and a student activity center). Moreover, there are school hall, library, tuckshop, backyard, two multi-purpose ball courts, two playgrounds and the chapel adjacent to the convent which give ample space for various student activities.

School clubs
There are 42 clubs in total. Form one to form five students are required to participate in at least one extra-curricular activity (either an academic club, a sports team or an instrument class) and at most four clubs. Catholic students are required to attend events organised by the Religious Affairs Club on top of meetings of other clubs.

Club committees are either appointed by teachers or elected by club members on the first meeting.

Eighty-percent of attendance is required or ranking will not be shown on students' report card.

External links

Quarry Bay
Catholic secondary schools in Hong Kong
Eastern District, Hong Kong
Canossian educational institutions
1959 establishments in Hong Kong
Educational institutions established in 1959